Mohammed El Berkani or Elberkani (born 13 December 1982 in Heerlen) is a Dutch retired footballer.

Club career
El Berkani played professional football in Holland for Roda JC and Fortuna Sittard and moved abroad to play for Lierse in Belgium. He then crossed borders again to play in Germany for Carl Zeiss Jena, Sportfreunde Siegen and Erzgebirge Aue.

In summer 2009 he joined Belgian third-tier side Visé and in 2012 he signed a contract with OC Khouribga in the Moroccan First Division until 2014.

He returned to Holland to play for amateur side EHC in 2013 and later played for GSV'28 and Eikenderveld. In September 2016 he joined the coaching staff of EHC's U-19 team.

Personal life
El Berkani also holds Moroccan citizenship.

References

1982 births
Living people
Sportspeople from Heerlen
Dutch sportspeople of Moroccan descent
Association football wingers
Dutch footballers
Roda JC Kerkrade players
Fortuna Sittard players
Lierse S.K. players
FC Carl Zeiss Jena players
Sportfreunde Siegen players
FC Erzgebirge Aue players
C.S. Visé players
Olympique Club de Khouribga players
2. Bundesliga players
3. Liga players
Dutch expatriate footballers
Dutch expatriate sportspeople in Germany
Dutch expatriate sportspeople in Belgium
Expatriate footballers in Germany
Expatriate footballers in Belgium
Footballers from Limburg (Netherlands)
Dutch expatriate sportspeople in Morocco
Expatriate footballers in Morocco